The Sistine Chapel of the ancients is an eight-mile stretch of cliff in Colombia that is covered by tens of thousands of paintings created up to 12,500 years ago. It is one of the world's largest collections of prehistoric rock art. It was discovered in 2019, but only announced in November 2020. It will appear in a Channel 4 documentary: Jungle Mystery: Lost Kingdoms of the Amazon.

Discovery
The site was discovered in 2017, but only announced in November 2020. The team that found it was led by José Iriarte and funded by the European Research Council.

Murals
The murals were painted with red-ochre.

References

Pre-Columbian art
Colombian art
Ancient art
Petroglyphs in South America